Kylian Yrnard (born 18 June 1995) is a Belgian-born Mauritian football player. He plays for RRC Waterloo. He also holds Belgian citizenship.

Club career
He played in the 2013–14 UEFA Youth League for Anderlecht.

International
He made his debut for the Mauritius national football team on 19 August 2017 in a friendly game against India.

References

External links
 
 

1995 births
Belgian people of Mauritian descent
Living people
Mauritian footballers
Mauritius international footballers
R.A.E.C. Mons players
Challenger Pro League players
Association football defenders